is a professional Japanese baseball player. He is a pitcher for the Yomiuri Giants of Nippon Professional Baseball (NPB).

References 

1998 births
Living people
Baseball people from Nara Prefecture
Nippon Professional Baseball outfielders
Yomiuri Giants players